Aldfield is a village and civil parish in the Harrogate district of North Yorkshire, England, about three miles west of Ripon. It is the closest village to Fountains Abbey and became part of the abbey estate in 1356. The population of the parish was estimated at 80 in 2013.

Aldfield was listed in the Domesday Book of 1086.

Sulphurous mineral springs were discovered near Aldfield in around 1698 leading to the establishment of Aldfield Spa. Lord de Grey, on whose land the spring was, adapted an adjacent cottage so that the water could be used there for the treatment of various ailments. It closed in the 1930s but the ruined buildings are still visible.

Historically, the village lay in the Claro Wapentake of the West Riding of Yorkshire.  It was transferred to North Yorkshire in 1974.

Aldfield was the birthplace of the artist William Powell Frith.

References

External links 
 
 

Villages in North Yorkshire
Civil parishes in North Yorkshire